Buegeleisen and Jacobson (B & J) was a musical instrument distributor in New York City, United States.

B & J opened for business in 1901, on 17th Street in Manhattan, run by the previously salesmen Samuel Buegeleisen (1871–1957) and David Jacobson (1869–1904). In 1913, they moved to University Place. They grew through the 1930s and 1940s, adapting their catalog as public tastes and demand changed. The company was closed in the early 1970s. The company sold instruments and accessories to dealers around the United States. Brands they owned or distributed for others included:

 Kay De Lux guitars
 Serenader guitars, banjos, and ukuleles
 S.S. Stewart guitars
 National guitars
 Abbott trumpets, clarinets, and trombones
 Salvadore De Durro violins
 Martin Freres flutes, oboes and clarinets
 Lamonte brand clarinets manufactured by Martin Freres
 Jean Martin brand clarinets manufactured by Martin Freres
 Coudet clarinets manufactured by Martin Freres
 Kent electric guitars
 
They also carried harmonicas, accordions, and many other instruments. Many of these instruments have become collectible.

References

External links

Abbott Buegeleisen Interview NAMM Oral History Library (2011)

1901 establishments in New York City
1970s disestablishments in New York (state)
American companies established in 1901
Retail companies established in 1901
Companies disestablished in the 1970s
Musical instrument retailers of the United States
Companies based in Manhattan
Defunct companies based in New York City